Sydel Finfer Silverman Wolf (May 20, 1933 – March 25, 2019) was an American anthropologist notable for her work as a researcher, writer, and advocate for the archival preservation of anthropological research. Silverman's early research focused on the study of complex societies and the history of anthropology. This work involved conducting anthropological research in Central Italy, with a focus on traditional agrarian systems, land reform, and festivals in central Italy. She later became active as an administrator, advocating for the study of cultural anthropology and an important force within the community where she organized discussions and symposia around the topic of preserving the anthropological records.

Early life and education 
Silverman was born in the Lawndale neighborhood on the west side of Chicago, Illinois, to Joseph Finfer, a rabbi and kosher shohet butcher, and Elizabeth Finfer (née Bassman), a cook. The youngest of seven children, her family was Orthodox Jewish and was very poor. Her parents came from Lithuania when they were adults.

Silverman's interest in anthropology began at an early age, thanks in part to her uncle Hirshel Bassman. With her uncle, Silverman explored ideas such as mysticism and "oriental religions."

In 1951, Silverman graduated from high school and began her studies at the University of Illinois at Navy Pier as a pre-med student. After two years, she applied to the University of Chicago's program in Committee on Human Development, and began studies at the University of Chicago in biology, psychology, and sociology-anthropology. In 1957, Silverman received a master's degree from the Committee on Human Development. Her thesis, The Female Climacterium was published the same year.

In 1957, Silverman enrolled at the PhD program in Anthropology at Columbia University. Conrad Arensberg's work in the Mediterranean, as well as a personal interest in the region, led Silverman to select Italy as the focus of her dissertation research.

Career

Early career 
Silverman's dissertation research was focused in the Italian village of Montecastello di Vibio. Her work in this region began in August 1960. Her work was one of the initial social-anthropological studies of  Central Italy, describing the mezzadria, the traditional agrarian system of the region. Shortly after Silverman's research, the mezzadria was abolished by law.

In 1963, Silverman received a PhD in Anthropology from Columbia University for a  dissertation  Landlord and peasant in an Umbrian community,   subsequently used as the basis of her first book, Three bells of civilization : the life of an Italian hill town.  This early work remains one of Silverman's most-cited contributions in the academic community.  Silverman's dissertation research was also the foundation of several additional journal articles.

Some of Silverman's photography from this period, (specifically 1960–1961), including photographs by her late husband Melvin Silverman can be viewed online.

Teaching 
After completing her PhD, Silverman worked as a teacher by Queens College in New York City from 1962–1975, while continuing  her research in Italy. H research included a 1967 study of land reform in the South of Italy, and several field seasons in Central Italy focused on a comparative study of competitive regional festivals.  From this time, Silverman's publications on Palio of Siena are the most noteworthy. At Queens College  Silverman began her career as an administrator when she was elected as Department Chair in 1970.

Administration 
(1975–1986)
From 1975–1986 Silverman was the Executive Officer of the CUNY Graduate Center  PhD Program in Anthropology.  Under her leadership, the program rose from disorganization and threat of disbandment to  one of the top ten anthropology doctoral programs in the United States of America. For a time, Silverman was also the acting Dean of Graduate Studies at CUNY.

Silverman moved to the Wenner-Gren Foundation in 1987 where she was appointed to the position of President of the Foundation, serving from 1987–1999. She was spokesperson for the organization, advocating for the field of anthropology as well as overseeing administrative tasks including fellowship and grant funding.  Silverman organized twenty-five international symposia during her years at Wenner-Gren.  These symposia became the topic of her 2002 book, The Beast on the Table which offers a rich narrative concerning the living history of anthropology.

Outside of her fieldwork, advocacy, and administrative work, Silverman's other major research interest has been on anthropology itself—particularly the history of anthropology and the practice of anthropology.  In addition to what has already been discussed, Silverman's work at Wenner-Gren also included an effort to preserve anthropological records.

Silverman's  selected bibliography is included below, and more detailed descriptions of a number of her books has been provided by Archivist Christy Fic in the Register to the Papers of Sydel Silverman.  Silverman's work in this area has spanned the course of her long career, and has continued into her retirement in 1999.

Silverman is President Emerita of the Wenner-Gren Foundation for Anthropological Research and Professor Emerita of Anthropology at the City University of New York.

Personal life 
In December 1953, Silverman married the painter Mel Silverman. They were married until his death in 1966. In 1972, she married anthropologist, Eric Wolf. They were married until his death in 1999.

In addition to two stepchildren from Wolf's first marriage, the couple have two children, Eve Silverman and film producer, Julie Yorn.

Silverman died on March 25, 2019 in New York City.

Selected works and publications 
Monographs

References

External links 
 Sydel Silverman papers, 1939–2010, bulk 1949–2010 at the National Anthropological Archives of the Smithsonian Institution

1933 births
2019 deaths
20th-century American anthropologists
21st-century archaeologists
20th-century American Jews
American non-fiction writers
American people of Lithuanian-Jewish descent
American women anthropologists
Anthropology educators
Cultural anthropologists
Social anthropologists
Graduate Center, CUNY faculty
Jewish anthropologists
21st-century American Jews
20th-century American women
21st-century American women